Khabarovsk virus (KBR) is a orthohantavirus in the Bunyavirales order isolated from Microtus fortis discovered in far-east Russia. It is an enveloped, negative-sense RNA virus.

Virology 

Two strains of KBR were isolated in Microtus fortis trapped in the Khabarovsk region of far-eastern Russia. The nucleotide sequences revealed that the two isolates were closely related to each other but distinct from all other hantaviruses. Phylogenetic analysis showed that these strains form a separate branch in the Hantavirus tree, positioned between the branches of Prospect Hill and Puumala viruses. Puumala virus was the closest relative, both genetically and serologically.

See also 
 RNA virus
 Puumala virus

References

External links 
 CDC's Hantavirus Technical Information Index page
 Virus Pathogen Database and Analysis Resource (ViPR): Bunyaviridae

Viral diseases
Hantaviridae
Hemorrhagic fevers